Phebalium tuberculosum is a species of erect shrub that is endemic to Western Australia. It has glandular-warty and scaly branchlets and leaves and white flowers arranged in umbels of three or four with rust-coloured scales on the back of the petals.

Description
Flowering occurs from September to December.

Taxonomy
This species was first formally described in 1862 by Ferdinand von Mueller who gave it the name Eriostemon tuberculosus and published the description the his book The Plants Indigenous to the Colony of Victoria.

The following year, George Bentham changed the name to Phebalium tuberculosum, publishing the change in Flora Australiensis.

Distribution and habitat
Phebalium tuberculosum grows on lateritic hills, on granite dunes and plains between Kalbarri, Katanning and Zanthus in Western Australia.

Conservation status
This phebalium is classified as "not threatened" by the Government of Western Australia Department of Parks and Wildlife.

References

tuberculosum
Flora of Western Australia
Plants described in 1862
Taxa named by Ferdinand von Mueller